The Trinity Place Apartments, located in northwest Portland, Oregon, is acknowledged by the National Register of Historic Places.

An unreinforced masonry building, placing it at high risk of collapse in a major earthquake, the  building was given a $1.3 million full seismic retrofit, in phases over a period of a few years, concluding in 2017.

See also
 National Register of Historic Places listings in Northwest Portland, Oregon

References

1911 establishments in Oregon
Hotel buildings completed in 1911
Apartment buildings on the National Register of Historic Places in Portland, Oregon
Individually listed contributing properties to historic districts on the National Register in Oregon
Northwest Portland, Oregon
Portland Historic Landmarks
Tudor Revival architecture in Oregon